Granulomatous slack skin (GSS) is a rare cutaneous condition, a variant of lymphoma that typically presents in middle-aged adults.

It is a form of cutaneous T-cell lymphoma and a variant of mycosis fungoides.

See also 
 List of cutaneous conditions

References

External links 

Lymphoid-related cutaneous conditions